Antonio Bioni (1698–1739) was an Italian composer, best known for his operas, and who, from 1726 onwards, spent a large part of his career working in Wrocław in present-day Poland.

He was born in Venice.

Operas
Climene (1722, Chioggia) 
Mitridate (1722, Ferrara) 
Cajo Mario (1722, Ferrara) 
Udine (1722, Venice) 
Orlando furioso (1724, Kuks) 
Armida abbandonata (1725, Prague) 
Armida al campo (1726, Wrocław) 
Endimione (1727, Wrocław) 
Lucio Vero (1727, Wrocław) 
Attalo ed Arsinoe (1727, Wrocław) 
Ariodante (1727, Wrocław) 
Filindo (1728, Wrocław) 
Artabano re de Parti (1728, Wrocław) 
Griselda (1728, Wrocław) 
Nissa ed Elpino (1728, Wrocław) 
Merope (1728, Wrocław) 
Arsinoe (1728, Wrocław) 
La fede tradita e vendicata (1729, Wrocław) 
Engelberta (1729, Wrocław) 
Andromaca (1729/30, Wrocław) 
Il ritorno del figlio con l'abito più approvato (1730, Prague) [with F. Mancini and M. Lucchini] 
Ercole su'l Termodonte (1730, Wrocław) 
Adone (1731, Prague) 
Silvia (1732, Wrocław) 
Siroe (1732, Wrocław) 
Lucio Papirio (1732, Wrocław) 
La verità conosciuta (1732, Wrocław) 
Demetrio (1732, Wrocław) 
Issipile (1732, Wrocław) 
L'Odio placato (1733, Wrocław) 
Artaserse (1733, Wrocław) 
Alessandro Severo (1733, Wrocław) 
Alessandro nell'Indie (1733, Wrocław) 
Girita (1738, Vienna)

References
Article "Bioni, Antonio" by Daniel E. Freeman and Sven Hansell in The Revised New Grove Dictionary of Music and Musicians (2001)

Daniel E. Freeman, The Opera Theater of Count Franz Anton von Sporck in Prague (1992)

1698 births
1739 deaths
18th-century Italian composers
Italian Baroque composers
Italian male classical composers
Italian opera composers
Male opera composers
Polish Baroque composers
Musicians from Venice
18th-century Italian male musicians